Camila Ignacia Zárate Zárate (born 4 January 1992) is a Chilean political activist who was elected as a member of the Chilean Constitutional Convention.

On 14 August 2021, it was reported that she resigned to The List of the People alongside Helmuth Martínez.

References

Living people
1992 births
Chilean activists
People from Santiago
21st-century Chilean politicians
21st-century Chilean women politicians
Members of the List of the People
Members of the Chilean Constitutional Convention